Paul Gust Vallas (born June 10, 1953) is an American politician and former education superintendent. A member of the Democratic Party, he served as the superintendent of the Bridgeport Public Schools and the Recovery School District of Louisiana, the CEO of both the School District of Philadelphia and the Chicago Public Schools, and a budget director for the city of Chicago.

Vallas is a candidate in the 2023 Chicago mayoral election. He finished first in the initial round of the election on February 28. Since no candidate received a majority of the vote, Vallas and the second-place finisher, Brandon Johnson, advanced to a runoff election scheduled to occur on April 4, 2023.

Vallas was a candidate in the 2019 Chicago mayoral election. He also ran in the Democratic primary of the 2002 Illinois gubernatorial election and as the Democratic nominee for lieutenant governor in the 2014 Illinois gubernatorial election.

Early life and career 

The grandson of Greek immigrants, Vallas grew up in the Roseland neighborhood on Chicago's South Side. He spent his teen years living in Palos Heights. He graduated from Carl Sandburg High School and attended Moraine Valley Community College and then Western Illinois University, where he received a bachelor's degree in history and political science, a master's degree in political science, and a teaching certificate.

From 1985 until 1990, Vallas led the Illinois Economic and Fiscal Commission. From 1990 until 1993, Vallas served as Chicago municipal budget director under Mayor Richard M. Daley.

Superintendencies
Vallas served as superintendent of school districts in four United States cities. Mitch Smith of The New York Times retrospectively wrote that in these positions, Vallas, "cultivated a reputation as a crisis manager and charter school supporter willing to take on hard jobs and implement sweeping changes, an approach that garnered a mix of praise and criticism." In a 2009 article in the academic journal Education Next, Dale Mezzacappa wrote of Vallas's leadership style in his Chicago and Philadelphia superintendencies, "His energy level is boundless, his temper legendary, his gangly charm equally so. His style of leadership, the 'Vallas treatment,' is by now well established. Do things big, do them fast, and do them all at once."

CEO of Chicago Public Schools
Vallas served as CEO of the Chicago Public Schools (CPS) from 1995 to 2001. The position of CEO of the Chicago Public School system had been created by Mayor Richard M. Daley after he convinced the Illinois State Legislature to place CPS under mayoral control.

During his tenure at CPS, Vallas led an effort to reform the school system.  President Bill Clinton cited his work for raising test scores, balancing the budget, instituting several new programs, including mandatory summer school and after-school programs, and expanding alternative, charter, and magnet schools.

In 1995, CPS faced a projected 1999 deficit of $1.4 billion. To address that deficit, Vallas submitted a plan that saved $162 million by reducing 1,700 central office staffers, raised cash by selling 20 surplus properties, and eliminated a program, described as "elaborate", to network the district's computers. The plan also reallocated money earmarked for teacher pensions into a general operating budget. In later years, a decrease in returns from the stock market and an increasing number of retirees caused CPS to be unable to make their full payments on time. This has been identified as an inciting incident for the subsequent $1 billion budget crisis, attributed largely to spiking pension payments in later years.

In June 2001, Vallas announced his resignation. His departure came two weeks after the resignation of Gery Chico, the president of the Chicago Board of Education. Both of their resignations came soon after several failing standardized testing scores eliminated the improvements to test scores that had been experienced over the previous two years. This loss of progress in test scores had angered Mayor Daley. Vallas's six-year tenure was greater than two-times the average tenure at the time for school superintendents in large U.S. cities.

As CEO, Vallas proposed and promoted a plan to reallocate money earmarked for teacher pensions into a general operating budget, which, in tandem with a later decline in returns from the stock market and an increasing number of retirees, has been blamed for causing Chicago Public Schools to be unable to make their full payments on time years later. This has been identified as a factor that contributed to the district's subsequent $1 billion budget crisis, as that crisis was largely caused by a spike pension payments obligations.

Many praised Vallas's tenure, crediting him with improving the school district's performance. Martha Woodall of The Philadelphia Inquirer wrote in 2002 that, in Chicago, Vallas attained a reputation of being, "savvy, hard-working, blunt-speaking manager who insists on doing things his own way." In a 2009 article published in the Peabody Journal of Education, Elizabeth Useem wrote that, as CEO of CPS, Vallas, "developed a reputation for being an energetic leader who could move quickly to carry out a far-reaching program of reform." Among the criticisms detractors had of Vallas's style of leadership in Chicago were characterizations of him as failing to sufficiently collaborate with community groups and showing hostility towards those who gave criticism or questioned his decisions.

CEO of the School District of Philadelphia
In July 2002, Vallas was appointed CEO of School District of Philadelphia. His appointment occurred six months after the state took over the school district. Vallas quickly moved to propose a reform agenda modeled after the actions he took in Chicago.

As CEO, he presided over the nation's largest experiment in privatized management of schools, with the management of over 40 schools turned over to outside for-profits, nonprofits, and universities beginning in Fall 2002. A 2007 RAND study of Philadelphia's privatization found that the achievement gains in Philadelphia's privately managed schools were on average no different from district-wide gains, nor were they substantially greater than those of other low-achieving schools in the state. In particular, schools that stayed under district management but received additional resources similar to those managed by for-profit firms showed directly comparable increases in math.

Vallas converted the school district to a K–8 and 9–12 grade structure which eliminated nearly all separate middle schools in the city. Vallas oversaw a standardization of the district's curriculum. Vallas also had the district create new after school programs, as well as new Saturday school and summer school programs which were mostly run by private companies such as The Princeton Review and Kaplan, Inc. As superintendent, Vallas also undertook a program of new school facility construction and renovation of existing facilities. Vallas's tenure saw the establishment of an increased number of privately-operated disciplinary schools and alternative schools. International Baccalaureate and Advanced Placement programs were expanded.

There was a gradual increase in standardized testing scores during Vallas's tenure. However, 11th grade scores still remained poor. There was also an increase in the number of schools meeting the Adequate Yearly Progress standards set by No Child Left Behind. Vallas failed to decrease the district's high dropout rate.

Vallas left the job in June 2007 to take a position in Louisiana. After Vallas departed, Thomas Brady served as interim CEO until Arlene Ackerman took office as CEO. Upon Vallas' departure, Vallas was described by Philadelphia Magazine as the, "most effective Philadelphia schools chief in a generation".  A study published by Harvard's Kennedy School of Government concluded, "the average student at schools managed by for-profit firms learned more in math than would be expected had the schools remained under district management." However, a $73.3 million annual budget deficit had arisen towards the end of his tenure, which proved a point criticism of towards Vallas. Vallas's addition of a vast number of new initiatives and programs contributed to the district's budget shortfall. Vallas's five-year tenure was longer than the typical tenure length of school superintendents in U.S. cities.

Superintendent Recovery School District of Louisiana
Vallas signed a two-year contract (2007–2008) as superintendent of the Recovery School District of Louisiana  He remained head of the Recovery School District through 2011. Vallas greatly increased the system's utilization of charter schools.

Superintendent of Bridgeport Public Schools
In December 2011, Vallas was hired by the board of education for Bridgeport, Connecticut to become the interim superintendent of Bridgeport Public Schools, effective January 1, 2012.

In June 2013, Vallas became the permanent superintendent of the Bridgeport Public Schools. In July, Connecticut Superior Court Justice Barbara Bellis ordered Vallas removed from the position after he neglected to complete mandated coursework and certification. The Connecticut Supreme Court overturned the ruling of the Bellis and ordered that Vallas be reinstated.

Vallas resigned on November 8, 2013 in order to run for lieutenant governor of Illinois.

Chicago State University
In January 2017, Governor of Illinois Bruce Rauner appointed Vallas to a vacant seat on the board of trustees of Chicago State University. Rauner's appointment of Vallas surprised some, as they had previously been political rivals. Rauner recommended that Vallas be made board chairman, despite the board having already elected a chairman months earlier. Instead, Vallas was made board secretary. Weeks after the appointment, Rauner recommended that Vallas be made a crisis manager for the University. This was not done.

After the university announced their intent to hire a new interim president as well as create and fill a position of chief administrative officer, Rauner recommended Vallas as his choice to serve as the interim president of Chicago State University. The board allowed for Vallas to apply for the two positions, but only once he stepped down from his position on their board. Objections were raised to the prospect of Vallas serving as president, with criticisms including objections to Rauner's level of involvement in choosing Vallas and other criticism opposing appointing Vallas, who is white, to lead a largely African-American university. In April, the university's board of trustees chose to appoint Rachel Lindsey as interim president, and appointed Vallas to serve as chief administrative officer. He served in the position during 2017 and 2018. In late-January 2018, after it became known that Vallas intended to leave the job to run for mayor of Chicago, the university's board dismissed him and expressed anger towards him, accusing him of using his position at the university to bolster his political prospects. Vallas had served only half the time that his contract with the university specified.

Other work in education
In 2002, before being appointed CEO of Philadelphia's school district, Vallas was one of several applicants seeking appointment as Illinois superintendent of education.

While working as superintendent in New Orleans, Vallas advised efforts to rebuild Haiti's school system following the 2010 earthquake in Haiti. His work in Haiti led actor Sean Penn to request that Vallas join his J/P Haitian Relief Foundation CORE's board of directors, which Vallas accepted. Vallas also worked in post-earthquake school matters in Chile. His work in Chile and Haiti ultimately lasted several years.

After the 2014 gubernatorial election, Vallas worked with the Bronner Group and the United States Department of Justice to develop a prison education program.

Paul Vallas is the co-chair of the Advisory Board for the National Education Support Network. According to them, Vallas was the lead consultant on "a plan to create, finance and operationalize the first publicly funded school system in Haiti."  On Thursday September 9, 2021, "The Arkansas Board of Education... gave final approval to four open-enrollment charter schools to begin operations in 2022 and 2023." Vallas was "one of the chief planners" for the Arkansas Military and First Responders Academy in Pulaski County, Arkansas. That school was proposed to the Arkansas Department of Education on March 31, 2020 by Rick W. Mills of the National Education Support Network, with a enrollment size than it would eventually be planned to accept (600 students vs 800 students).

Political career

2002 campaign for governor of Illinois

Following his tenure at CPS, Vallas ran for governor of Illinois as a Democrat.  Vallas placed second in the Democratic primary in March 2002, losing to then-U.S. congressman Rod Blagojevich and finishing ahead of former state attorney general Roland Burris.

Former congressman Glenn Poshard, a conservative Democrat, campaigned on behalf of Vallas. Before launching his gubernatorial campaign, Vallas had been asked by Poshard, who had considered running himself, to run in the Democratic lieutenant gubernatorial primary as Poshard's co-endorsed candidate. Vallas wasn't interested in running for lieutenant governor. Months later, Vallas reflected on this decision by asking, "does anyone really know what the lieutenant governor does?" Vallas also received the endorsements of the editorial boards of the Chicago Tribune and the St. Louis Post-Dispatch.

The general chairman of Vallas's campaign was Christopher G. Kennedy. Brendan Reilly served as the campaign's communications director.

2010 prospective candidacies
During his tenure as superintendent in Louisiana, he floated the possibility of running for office back in Illinois, but ultimately did not pursue either race. On April 28, 2008 he appeared before the City Club of Chicago and on Chicago news shows discussing a possible run for governor in 2010.

In February 2009, Vallas gave an interview to Carol Marin in the Chicago Sun-Times and stated that he planned to return to Cook County, Illinois in 2009 and run as a Republican for president of the Cook County Board of Commissioners in the 2010 race, forming an exploratory committee. On June 11, 2009, Vallas announced that he would not be a candidate for President of the Cook County Board of Commissioners in 2010. Vallas stated that he could not "begin a political campaign while trying to finish what he started—rebuild the school system there in the aftermath of Hurricane Katrina."

2014 campaign for Illinois lieutenant governor

In November 2013, Illinois Governor Pat Quinn tapped Vallas to be his running mate in the 2014 election after incumbent lieutenant governor Sheila Simon chose to run for Comptroller. Quinn and Vallas lost the election to the Republican ticket of Bruce Rauner and Evelyn Sanguinetti.

During the campaign, Vallas played the role of the campaign's "attack dog", heavily criticizing Bruce Rauner.

2019 Chicago mayoral candidacy

In March 2018, Vallas formally filed to become a candidate in the 2019 Chicago mayoral election.

When he entered the race, Vallas was seen as a potentially strong opponent to incumbent Rahm Emanuel, who was seeking reelection at the time. In September, Emanuel dropped out of the race, and the field for mayor grew, with many more high-profile candidates entering the race. After Emanuel withdrew his planned candidacy, a large number of prominent political figures adjoined the field running for mayor of Chicago. Among the contenders to enter the race at this point was Gery Chico, Vallas's one-time political ally with whom he had previously overseen the Chicago Public Schools. Vallas had previously endorsed Chico for mayor in 2011. Despite this history, Vallas did not hesitate to criticize Chico as a mayoral opponent.

Vallas staked a large part of his candidacy on his record as head of Chicago Public Schools, arguing that he helped to turn around the school system and that his leadership left the system in better shape. Vallas claimed that the Chicago Public Schools were healthier under his leadership than they were in 2019. PolitiFact rated this claim as "mostly true".

As a candidate, Vallas pledged to combat political corruption in Chicago's City Hall.

Vallas was endorsed by Deborah Lynch, former president of the Chicago Teachers Union. Rocky Wirtz, chairman of the Chicago Blackhawks, was a major campaign donor to Vallas. Vallas also received a rare mayoral endorsement from the Chicago Republican Party. Chicago Republican Party Chair Chris Cleveland called Vallas the "lesser of 13 evils." Vallas welcomed the endorsement, commenting, "This is a non-partisan election and I'm running for mayor to represent all Chicagoans. I've traveled to every ward and met with every constituency. The crisis that Chicago faces affects all citizens. I thank the Republican committee for their confidence in my candidacy." Former governor Bruce Rauner, a Republican, commented in an interview that, of those running, Vallas, "might make the best mayor."

Vallas's campaign sent unsolicited text messages. The campaign employed North Carolina-based firm Link2Tek to accomplish this. In mid-January 2019, a class-action lawsuit was filed against the Vallas campaign, alleging that it had violated the Telephone Consumer Protection Act of 1991, which prohibits calling or texting a person using an automatic telephone dialing system without their consent. Vallas accused the lawsuit of being, "a dirty trick" orchestrated by the "political machine". A motion by Link2Tek's (a co-defendant in the lawsuit) to dismiss the lawsuit was denied in August 2020.

As the election came close, despite the race being highly competitive, outlets such as The Wall Street Journal and Chicago magazine did not consider Vallas among the top contenders to advance to a likely runoff election. Ultimately, in the first round of the election, Vallas placed ninth out of fourteen candidates, receiving 30,236 votes (5.43% of the votes cast). Failing to advance to the runoff, Vallas endorsed Lori Lightfoot.

2023 Chicago mayoral candidacy

First round
In June 2022, Vallas announced his candidacy for mayor again in the 2023 election, challenging incumbent Mayor Lori Lightfoot. Vallas was a critic of the Lightfoot administration over what he characterized as her lack of accountability in the rise of crime and violence in the city.

Vallas's campaign staff includes a number of  nationally prominent consultants, including Joe Trippi as its senior strategist and media advisor Vallas's campaign also employs pollster Mark Mellman.

Vallas has centered his candidacy on the issue of crime. He has also promised that he would extend both the length of the school day and the school year. He has also pledged that he would give "100% choice" to parents as to what schools their children attend.

The month that he launched his campaign, Vallas appeared at a fundraising event for Awake IL, a political not-for-profit that has been criticized for its anti-LGBTQ rhetoric. In August 2022, Vallas condemned the group saying "I am a lifelong Democrat who has spent my entire adult life fighting hateful rhetorical and hateful groups." His claim of being a "lifelong Democrat" was called into question by some, who pointed to campaign contributions from prominent Republican donor Michael Keiser and Chicago Board of Elections records listing Vallas as having voted in the 2022 Republican Party primary election. The Chicago Board of Elections later told reporters that Vallas had not voted in the Republican primary, and records that showed him as having done so were due to a "coding error."

Vallas is the only white, non-Hispanic candidate on the ballot in the 2023 mayoral election. Seven of the other candidates are Black, while one is Latino. Edward Robert McClelland of Chicago magazine remarked that his being the sole White candidate means that, unlike in the 2019 mayoral election, "[Vallas] doesn't have to share that constituency with Bill Daley, Jerry Joyce, or Garry McCarthy." McClelland also regarded Vallas to be running as a police-friendly candidate. Similarly, Justin Kaufman of Axios opined that Vallas is "the candidate most likely to court the police and firefighter vote." Vallas received the endorsement of Chicago's Fraternal Order of Police (FOP) lodge, which serves as the city's police union.

In addition to being endorsed by the Fraternal Order of Police, Vallas was also endorsed in the election's first round by International Union of Elevator Constructors Local 2 and the editorial boards of both the Chicago Tribune and The Gazette. Also endorsing Vallas were Chicago aldermen Brian K. Hopkins Anthony Napolitano, Brendan Reilly, and Tom Tunney.

Many view Vallas as being either a conservative or politically moderate candidate, especially when compared to other candidates in the election. Vallas has also received significant campaign donations from sources considered politically conservative. Lightfoot and fellow candidate Chuy García sought to cast Vallas as aligned with the Republican Party. During the campaign, Lightfoot has characterized Vallas as being her most conservative challenger. Lightfoot and García both have accused Vallas of being inadequately pro-choice, despite Vallas having a past record of claiming to be pro-choice and past endorsements from Planned Parenthood and Personal PAC during his 2002 gubernatorial and 2014 lieutenant gubernatorial campaigns. Lightfoot and Garcia pointed to a 2009 interview in which Vallas declared himself to be "more of a Republican than a Democrat because, fundamentally, I oppose abortion", stated that "if I were to run for office again, I would run as a Republican",  Another line of attack for Lightfoot and García was Vallas's relationship with and endorsement from the city's police union. and declared that he would "probably register as a Republican in the next primary." However, in the full interview, while Vallas declared itself to oppose abortion, he also described himself as "personally pro-choice".

By early February, polls showed Vallas to be among the front-runners. In early February, Vallas received the endorsement of the editorial board of the Chicago Tribune. Soon after, Vallas faced allegations that his permanent residence was actually in Palos Heights, Illinois rather than Chicago after an investigative report by WTTW-TV based upon reported tax filings, raising questions of Vallas's legal eligibility to hold the office of mayor of Chicago. Vallas responded that he lived in Chicago, while his wife live in Palos Heights to care for her elderly parents. On February 23, the Tribune released a report on an investigation of Vallas's Twitter account, showing that it had liked several tweets that "used racist language, supported controversial police tactics like 'stop-and-frisk' or insulted the mayor in personal terms." Vallas denied liking the tweets and claimed that his account had been hacked.

On February 28, 2023, Vallas was the top vote-getter in the first round of the election, receiving 32.91% of the vote, which meant that he would advanced to the runoff along with runner-up Brandon Johnson. Among the areas where Vallas saw his greatest levels of support was the city's downtown as well areas of the northwest and southwest sides of the city with large working-class White populations. Some analysts believe that Vallas benefited greatly from staking out a "tough-on-crime" stance amid widespread concerns among Chicagoans about crime.

Runoff
Three candidates eliminated in the first round have endorsed Vallas in the runoff: businessman Willie Wilson, Alderman Roderick Sawyer, and activist Ja'Mal Green.  In addition to the four incumbent aldermen who had endorsed Vallas ahead of the first round of the election, Vallas has received the endorsement of a further incumbent sixteen aldermen (including the aforementioned Sawyer endorsement). A number of these came from several "pro-police" hispanic ward aldermen.

Some individuals and unions that had endorsed Lightfoot in the first round have endorsed Vallas in the runoff. These include the International Association of Bridge, Structural, Ornamental and Reinforcing Iron Workers Chicago District Council, Plumbers Local 130 (an United Association affiliate), Cook County Board of Review member and former alderman George Cardenas. as well as aldermen Walter Burnett Jr., Michelle A. Harris, and Emma Mitts.' Vallas has also been endorsed by Alderman Raymond Lopez (a first-round Willie Wilson supporter who had briefly run for mayor himself) Alderman David H. Moore (a first-round Sophia King supporter) and the International Union of Operating Engineers Local 150 (which had endorsed García in the first round).

Other unions and organizations that endorsed Vallas in the runoff are International Brotherhood of Electrical Workers Locals 9 and 134,International Brotherhood of Teamsters JC25, International Union of Operating Engineers Local 399, and Laborers' International Union of North America Chicago District Council, and the Armenian National Committee of America. Other notable figures to endorse Vallas after he advanced to the runoff include former Illinois Secretary of State Jesse White, former President of the Illinois Senate Emil Jones, and conservative hedge fund manager Ken Griffin. Two-time mayoral candidate and former chair of Illinois State Board of Education Gery Chico, who had worked alongside Vallas when they were leaders of the Chicago Public Schools, also endorsed Vallas.

Vallas has accused Johnson of lacking "substance" and of lacking a significant political record.

Continuing the charge that had been prominently led by Lightfoot and García in the first round of the election, Johnson has characterized Vallas as a Republican masquerading as a Democrat. Johnson has criticized Vallas for ties to  Republican Party organizations and figures, as well as ties to conservative causes. In the first runoff debate, Johnson remarked "Chicago cannot afford Republicans like Paul Vallas". This has included bringing up 2009 remarks in which Valls had expressed opposition to abortion rights and declared himself "more of a Republican than a Democrat." In response to this line of criticism, Vallas has continued to proclaimed himself a "lifelong Democrat", citing his previous 2002 gubernatorial and 2014 lieutenant gubernatorial campaigns as a Democrat.

Other activity
In 2020, Vallas served as an unpaid consultant to Chicago's Fraternal Order of Police police union during contract negotiations with the city of Chicago, playing a role in the negotiations. The Union's head, John Catanzara, touted Vallas's presence at negotiation with assisting the police union's bargaining.

Political stances
During his 2002 gubernatorial campaign, Vallas opposed the concealed carry of firearms and was in favor of banning semi-automatic firearms. He supported a plan by Mayor Daley to reconfigure O'Hare International Airport's runways and to add more runways to the airport. He also was in support of constructing a new airport in Chicago's southern suburbs. Vallas also opposed a proposed casino in Rosemont, Illinois, citing a belief that gambling should only be permitted to advance economic development. He also opposed raising the state income tax, claiming that it would be wrong to do so amid an economic downturn.

During his 2002 gubernatorial campaign, and throughout much of his political career, Vallas has positioned himself as supportive of abortion rights. In a 2009 interview, Vallas claimed both to oppose abortion and to be "personally pro-choice."

During his 2002 gubernatorial campaign, Vallas opposed using public subsidies to renovate Soldier Field (a stadium in Chicago). He also opposed the proposed design of the renovation and was against the possible selling of naming rights for the stadium. During his 2023 mayoral campaign, Vallas has stated that he believes it is too late to persuade the Chicago Bears football team to remain at Soldier Field amid plans by the Bears to build a new stadium in Arlington Heights, Illinois. He also opposed a $2.2 billion renovation of the stadium floated by Mayor Lightfoot.

In his 2023 mayoral campaign, Vallas has campaigned as "tough-on-crime".

Personal life
Vallas and his wife, Sharon Vallas, have three children, Gus, Mark, and Paul Jr. In 2018, Vallas's son Mark died as a result of opioid abuse.

Electoral history

Works authored
Op-eds
Chicago's road to financial calamity (published October 20, 2021 by Crain's Chicago Business)
The city and Cook County government have surrendered their obligation to keep us safe (published February 15, 2022 in the Chicago Tribune)
Some fast, necessary solutions that would improve the Chicago Police Department and reduce violent crime. (published March 9, 2022 in the Chicago Tribune)
It will take proactive policing to defend downtown Chicago (published March 9, 2022 in the Chicago Tribune)
Let’s put an end to Chicago leaders’ fuzzy budgeting math with a council budget office (published March 9, 2022 in the Chicago Tribune)

References

External links

Collected news and commentary at NOLA.com
Distinguished Scholar Paul Vallas at the Wilson Center

Political Educator Alexander Russo, Education Next, Winter 2003
The Vallas Effect, Dale Mezzacappa, Education Next, Spring 2008
Leadership: A Challenging Course Learning Matters, profile of Vallas's work in New Orleans, 2008
School's out for Vallas, CTPost.com, June 29, 2013

|-

1953 births
20th-century American politicians
21st-century American politicians
American people of Greek descent
CEOs of Chicago Public Schools
Education in Haiti
Education in New Orleans
Education in Philadelphia
Educators from Illinois
Illinois Democrats
Living people
Politicians from Chicago
Western Illinois University alumni